Guntakal revenue division is an administrative division in the Anantapur district of the Indian state of Andhra Pradesh. This division headquarters is located at Guntakal. It is one of the three revenue divisions in the district and comprises eight mandals. It was formed on 4 April 2022.

Administration 
The revenue division comprises eight mandals: Guntakal, Gooty, Pamidi, Peddavaduguru, Uravakonda, Vajrakarur, Vidapanakallu and Yadiki.

References 

2022 establishments in Andhra Pradesh
Revenue divisions in Anantapur district